The São Bento River is a river of Goiás state in central Brazil.

See also
List of rivers of Goiás

External links
Brazilian Ministry of Transport

Rivers of Goiás